Tay Kexin (born 29 January 1988) is a Singaporean singer-songwriter. She is the younger sister of Tay Kewei. She is currently a member of the Asian Pop-rock vocal band MICappella. She is also an entrepreneur and the founder of Sparkle Live Music along with her elder sister and keyboardist Lee Ein Ein.

Career
Tay Kexin contested as a PK Challenger on Taiwan’s Super Idol Season 5 in 2011 and was known as the “Jazz Queen” of Singapore. Her regular performance at Switch by Timbre had also amassed a fan following. Her versatility from sweet jazz numbers to high energy pop hits has since made her extremely popular on various occasions.

In March 2012, along with her elder sister Tay Kewei and keyboardist Lee Ein Ein, founded Sparkle Live Music, which was a premier live music provider for weddings and events in Singapore.

In December 2012, Tay released her own EP Get Set Go, in which she penned songs of positivity and new beginnings, which topped Singapore’s CD-RAMA regional charts within the first week of sales. Her song, Prove Myself was also ranked no. 12 on MeRadio’s 2012 Top 20 singles, and appeared as one of the soundtracks for Mediacorp Channel U’s hit drama show “Marry Me”.

In December 2013, Tay was appointed as a backing vocalist for David Tao's Concert World Tour and had traveled with him to perform at over 15 city states, including countries like China, Taiwan, Hong Kong, Malaysia etc.

In December 2014, Tay was invited to participate in the Youth Time 2014 Dialogue with the PM and other Youths at Anderson Junior College, her former junior college in Singapore and was awarded the Breakthrough in Arts Award by Prime Minister Lee Hsien Loong.

On 30 April 2015, Tay Kexin had emerged as one of the Top 10 contender in The Voice Of China Singapore competition.

Personal life 
On October 2022, Tay was engaged to her longtime partner and photographer Bernard Wee, with the proposal on stage at MICappella concert.

References

1988 births
Living people
Singaporean singer-songwriters
Singaporean people of Chinese descent
21st-century Singaporean women singers
Singaporean Mandopop singers